is a 1993 side-scrolling shooter video game.

Gameplay
R-Type III: The Third Lightning was the first game in the series to introduce new Forces. As well as the original Force (which was now named the Round Force, later named as the Standard Force in R-Type Delta), the player could choose from two other Forces: the Shadow Force and the Cyclone Force. These both had new, different weapon sets and special enhancements.

It also refined the weapons and charging system. It reverted to the original red-blue-yellow weapon system, and the Diffusion Wave Cannon from R-Type II was replaced with a more standard wave cannon. Charging this cannon to full beam strength results in a massive, powerful beam that passes through all enemies and obstacles.
A new weapon called the Hyper Wave Cannon was also added to the ship, which the player could use instead of the normal wave cannon if desired. By switching to Hyper mode and supercharging the wave cannon, the ship temporarily gains the ability to use the Hyper Wave Cannon, which is unique among wave cannons in having a rapid fire capability. The shots fired create damaging explosions, and if the player has collected one or two Bits, they spin around the ship burning with energy. However, this Hyper mode causes the ship to overheat after a short while, and it must subsequently spend seconds cooling down, during which time the wave cannon is inoperative.

The fighter in R-Type III is identified in R-Type Final as the R-9Ø Ragnarök; it was originally referred to as the 'R-90'. In fact, the original R-90 has been split into three in Final: the R-9S Strike Bomber has the R-90's basic Standard force unit and first wave cannon, identified as the Mega Wave Cannon. Final's version of the R-90 has the Shadow Force and Hyper Wave Cannon, but is unable to choose its Force or switch between Wave Cannons. Finally, the R-9Ø2 Ragnarok II has the R-90's final Force, the Cyclone Force, and the Giga Wave Cannon, which can be charged through 7 loops. It can be assumed that this is because the original R-90 would simply be too powerful for the game to be any kind of challenge.

Release 
R-Type III was originally released only on the Super NES, but later ported to the Game Boy Advance by Italy-based Raylight Studios.

The SNES version was released for download on the Nintendo Wii's Virtual Console, but was delisted in Japan on March 30, 2012, Europe on March 31, 2012 and North America on January 2, 2013.

At the CES 2018, Retro-bit has announced that they would be re-releasing R-Type III: The Third Lightning as well as its other installments on a Super NES multicart that was released in May 2018, having a Standard Edition and a Limited Collector’s Edition as well.

R-Type III: The Third Lightning is a game built into Retro-Bit's Super Retrocade, which features a number of legally-licensed titles.  (In the version 1.1 release of that product, the first R-Type and R-Type II are also included games.)

Reception

Electronic Gaming Monthly'''s five reviewers gave the Super NES version a unanimous score of 8 out of 10 each, commenting that "Huge levels, excellent bosses (and a rather high difficulty) makes this the shooter to get." They also praised the inclusion of a two-player mode. R-Type III: The Third Lightning was awarded Best Shooter of 1994 by Electronic Gaming Monthly. M! Games gave it a score of 84. Super Gamer gave the game an overall score of 91%, summarizing: "Stonking conversion of the classic shoot-'em-up from the Eighties. Graphics are coin-op quality, sound is excellent - and it's [..] hard!"

Accolades

In 1997, Electronic Gaming Monthly'' ranked the Super NES version the 23rd best console video game of all time, saying that compared to its predecessors it had virtually eliminated the slowdown, increased the difficulty, improved the graphics and sounds, and expanded the strategy by allowing the player to choose from three different Force Device units.  IGN ranks it #65 on its list of the Top SNES Games of All Time. In 2018, Complex ranked the game 32nd on their "The Best Super Nintendo Games of All Time." In 1995, Total! rated the game 42nd in their Top 100 SNES Games.

References

External links

1993 video games
Super Nintendo Entertainment System games
Game Boy Advance games
R-Type
Science fiction video games
Video game sequels
Destination Software games
Video games developed in Japan
Video games developed in Italy
Video games set in the 22nd century
Horizontally scrolling shooters
Jaleco games
Virtual Console games for Wii